Fidel Christian Rubí Huicochea (born 24 October 1982) is a Mexican politician from the National Action Party. In 2012 he served as Deputy of the LXI Legislature of the Mexican Congress representing Morelos.

References

1982 births
Living people
Politicians from Morelos
National Action Party (Mexico) politicians
21st-century Mexican politicians
Deputies of the LXI Legislature of Mexico
Members of the Chamber of Deputies (Mexico) for Morelos